The Type 362 is an air/surface search radar and was first displayed at ASIANDEX 1988 and in its original guise have only been installed on the Luhu class DDG, Luda class DDG 166 and selected Jianghu FFGs.

Development 
Development for an air defense radar system begun in July 1974, with design finalized in August 1975, consisted of two radars, the 1st being a search radar designated as Type 347S with S stands for search, and a 2nd fire control radar for guns, designated as Type 347G with G as gun. Design was completed by the 723rd Institute in May 1976 and finalized in October 1977. Subsystems tests on land were completed by the end of 1982. After further tests from November 1986 to September 1987, the system was accepted into service, and Type 347S radar subsequently renamed as Type 362 radar.

A possibly updated variant have been seen on the Type 022 Houbei class PFG under the guise export designation of MR36A and is currently marketed through CETC.

Specifications 
 X – band
 Range:
 > 42 km against 2m2 target
 > 120 km OTH
 Range accuracy:60m
 Azimuth accuracy: 0.5 degrees
 Beam: 2 x 10 degrees (dual beam pattern)
 Frequency agile bandwidth: > 360 MHz
 Gain: 33.5 dBm
 Scan Rate: 30 rpm
 Target tracking numbers: 32 batches
 Antenna weight: 350 kg, stabilized
 Overall weight: 1100 kg
 Other reported names:
 ESR-1
 MR36A

See also 
 Type 052 Luhu-class destroyer

References

External references 
 China Shipbuilding Industry Corporation 
 Nanjing Marine Radar Research Institute  

Sea radars
Military radars of the People's Republic of China